Kheri Ram Nagar is a village situated in Haryana state of India in District Kurukshetra. This is a small village having about 3500 people living in it. 

The village has a Government Middle School. 

The land surrounding the village is fertile, and the main occupation of the villagers is Agriculture. The people living in village are mainly Hindu by religion.

History
Kheri Ram Nagar was founded by Ch.Naanu Ji between 1840 and 1860. He was arrived from a nearby village named "Mathana" from a Kanyan gotra,  which is in the same district, Kurukshetra. The village is still called "Naanu wali Kheri" by village elders.

Sarpanch/Pardhan -

Ch.Munshi Ram,

Ch.Kabaj Singh,

Ch.Kuldeep Singh,

Ch.Sher Singh Sher,

Ch.Kuldeep Singh,

Smt.Nirmal Devi Verma,
   
Sh. Natha Ram,
        
Smt.Shailes Devi

Smt.Sunita Devi - Present

References 

District Disaster Management Plan KURUKSHETRA
5 booked in illegal colony case. Tribune India. 25 May 2012.
Geetika wins gold in Haryana State Games. One India, 3 October 2007.

Villages in Kurukshetra district